Lamboo Gunian (also referred to as Koongie Park) is a small Aboriginal community, located  east of Halls Creek in the Kimberley region of Western Australia, within the Shire of Halls Creek.

Native title 
The community is located within the registered Koongie Elvire (WAD6157/98) native title claim area.

Governance 
The community is managed through its incorporated body, Koongie Elvira Aboriginal Corporation (formally Lamboo Gunian Aboriginal Corporation), incorporated under the Aboriginal Councils and Associations Act 1976 on 2 June 1980.

Town planning 
Lamboo Gunian Layout Plan No.2 has been prepared in accordance with State Planning Policy 3.2 Aboriginal Settlements. Layout Plan No.2 was endorsed by the community on 17 December 2002 and the Western Australian Planning Commission on 9 September 2003. The layout plan map-set and background report can be viewed at Planning Western Australia's website.

Notes

External links 
 Office of the Registrar of Indigenous Corporations
 Native Title Claimant application summary

Aboriginal communities in Kimberley (Western Australia)